The Rivals is a 1961 television play broadcast by the Australian Broadcasting Corporation. It was directed by Christopher Muir.

Premise
Captain Absolute, son of the wealthy Sir Anthony, poses as a penniless ensign to win the heart of Lydia Languish. Lydia's aunt is negotiating another match.

Cast
Patricia Kennedy as Mrs Malaprop
Patsy King as Lydia
James Bailey as Sir Anthony Absolute 
Fred Parslow as Captain Absolute
Michael Duffield as Bob Acres
Anne Charleston as Julia
George Whaley as Faulkland
Clement McCallin as Sir Lucius O'Trigger

Production
Rivals.

References

External links

Australian television plays
Australian Broadcasting Corporation original programming
English-language television shows
1961 television plays